The threadfin cardinalfish or bluestreak cardinalfish, Zoramia leptacantha, it is one of the cardinalfishes found in the Red Sea and off Mozambique Island to Samoa and Tonga, north to Ryukyu Islands, and south to New Caledonia and Micronesia.

A translucent fish with vertical iridescent blue lines on the head and front of body, it grows up to 6 cm in length. In juveniles, the blue lines are missing. Adults occur in small aggregations from 1 to at least 12 m deep, usually close to branching coral, in sheltered bays and lagoons.

References

External links
 

Threadfin cardinalfish
Fish of the Red Sea
Taxa named by Pieter Bleeker
Fish described in 1856